The UEFA European Under-18 Championship 1992 Final Tournament was held in Germany. It also served as the European qualification for the 1993 FIFA World Youth Championship.

Teams

The following teams qualified for the tournament:

  (qualified as )
 
  (host, but still qualified)

Quarterfinals

Semifinals

Places 5-8

Places 1-4

Third place match

Final

Qualification to World Youth Championship
The six best performing teams qualified for the 1993 FIFA World Youth Championship.

  (as )

See also
 1992 UEFA European Under-18 Championship qualifying

External links
Results by RSSSF

UEFA European Under-19 Championship
1992
Under-18
Under-18
UEFA Under-19
1992 in youth association football